The Little Devil (original Italian name Il piccolo diavolo) is a 1988 Italian film directed by and starring Roberto Benigni, also starring Walter Matthau, Stefania Sandrelli, Nicoletta Braschi and John Lurie. In some European countries and in Australia, an English version of the film, with local subtitles, has been screened and circulated in VHS. In the English version, the voices of the main actors are dubbed by themselves; some scenes may have been filmed in both languages.

Plot 
In the North American Pontifical College, in Rome, Father Maurice (Walther Matthau) is in deep turmoil because of Patricia (Stefania Sandrelli), a woman who loves him and expects him to make up his mind and clear out his position towards her. While he is trying to do so, he is summoned by a novice for an emergency. The emergency turns out to be a fat woman possessed by a demon. Father Maurice performs the rite of exorcism and expels the demon from the woman. The demon (Roberto Benigni), a little escaped devil named Giuditta, having nowhere else to go, starts following Father Maurice everywhere and often indulges in mischief getting Maurice in trouble. In one instance Giuditta replaces a sick Father Maurice in Mass, turning the solemn ceremony in a beauty parade. Maurice tries to get rid of Giuditta in several failed efforts. Showing signs of exhaustion, his peers advise him to take a vacation. Eventually another agent "from where Giuditta came from" appears as Nina (Nicoletta Braschi) and manages to attract Giuditta who finally leaves Maurice and follows her "elsewhere".

Cast 
Roberto Benigni as Giuditta, the little devil
Walter Matthau as Father Maurice
Nicoletta Braschi as Nina
Stefania Sandrelli as Patrizia
John Lurie as Cusatelli
Paolo Baroni as Saverio
Franco Fabrizi as Prete
Annabella Schiavone as Giuditta, the woman

Awards 
Roberto Benigni won the David di Donatello Award for Best Actor.

External links 
 
 
 
 The Little Devil at Variety Distribution

1988 films
1988 comedy films
1980s Italian-language films
Films set in Italy
Films shot in Tuscany
Films shot in Rome
Films directed by Roberto Benigni
Films with screenplays by Vincenzo Cerami
Italian comedy films
Columbia Pictures films
1980s Italian films